Bigelowiella natans is a species of Chlorarachniophyte alga that is a model organism for the Rhizaria.

Chlorarachniophyte are unicellular marine algae with plastids of secondary endosymbiotic origin. Bigelowiella natans are a key resource for studying the supergroup of mostly unicellular eukaryotes.

Genomes
The Bigelowiella natans genome was the first rhizarian nuclear genome to be sequenced. The genome contains 94.7 Mbp encoding for 21,708 genes.

References

Filosa
Model organisms
Protists described in 2001
Cercozoa species